The Lord of the Rings: Journey to Rivendell was a video game scheduled to be released in the winter of 1983. Parker Brothers was set to publish it, and advertised it in their 1982 and 1983 catalogues as a game that would be released on the Atari 2600 and Atari Home Computer. The game was originally advertised under the name Lord of the Rings, and in one case as The Lord of the Rings I. It was described as an adventure of getting Frodo from the Shire to the door at Moria, a description which was later changed in the 1983 Parker Brothers Video Games catalogue to have Rivendell as the adventures end point instead. The same catalogue was first time the game was ever referred to as The Lord of the Rings: Journey to Rivendell, and was the last advertisement the game ever received. The game was never released, and it was believed that little or no work was done on the game's coding. 

Almost twenty years after The Lord of the Rings: Journey to Rivendell was first announced, in the weeks leading up to the much anticipated release of the first live-action movie, a former Parker Brothers employee gave a prototype of the game to the operator of the AtariAge website. Surprisingly, the game was quite complex and seemed to be complete.

Gameplay 
The game's objective is to travel as Frodo from the Shire to Rivendell while avoiding The Black Riders. If Frodo is caught by The Black Riders, he will be sent backwards from Rivendell and will be wounded. If Frodo is wounded too many times, or fails to reach Rivendell within 7 days, the game ends. As time passes the Nazgûl become faster and harder for Frodo to avoid, especially at night. Frodo can receive helpful bonuses, such as faster movement, by exploring and finding other characters from The Lord of the Rings. The other characters in the game are assumed to be Sam Gamgee, Aragorn, Gandalf, Tom Bombadil, and Glorfindel, though due to the low resolution of the Atari 2600 and the lack of an official reference manual, the identities of some of the game characters are debated by players. The game's Glorfindel and Tom Bombadil characters are often interpreted as Legolas and Gimli respectively.

A second prototype of the game, labeled "WIP .17", was eventually discovered. There are less than ten bytes of data distinguishing the WIP .17 prototype from the first prototype, which itself was labeled "LOTR". The LOTR prototype is believed to be the more finalized version of the two. The two versions, upon reaching Rivendell, play different victory tunes from each other. The tune is noted as sounding distinctly worse in the WIP .17 prototype. In the WIP .17 prototype the Nazgûl are faster with the left difficulty switch set to B. However, the player receives a point bonus for playing with the switch set to A. In the LOTR prototype A is the harder difficulty with faster Nazgûl, and receives the appropriate point bonus.

Sources
http://www.atariprotos.com/2600/software/lotr/lotr.htm
Lord of the Rings: Journey to Rivendell at AtariAge

References

Cancelled Atari 2600 games
Video games based on Middle-earth
Parker Brothers video games